Caecum striatum is a species of minute sea snail, a marine gastropod mollusk or micromollusk in the family Caecidae.

Distribution

Description
The maximum recorded shell length is 2 mm.

Habitat
Minimum recorded depth is 2 m. Maximum recorded depth is 30 m.

References

Caecidae
Gastropods described in 1868